The Vipul shipyard is a shipbuilding works at Magdalla Port in the Surat district of Gujarat.

As of 2007, the works consisted of a slipway and 100 meters of waterfront spread across 8 acres of land.
In May 2007, the ABG Shipyard Limited signed a Memorandum of Understanding (MOU) for its acquisition.
In August 2007, the acquisition was completed and thus Vipul Shipyard gained control of the ABG shipyard.
After acquisition, a further contiguous 12 acres was added to it. This led to an increase in the waterfront by 200 meters.
The works is now also referred as "ABG shipyard unit-II."

See also
Vipul-class barge, built for the Indian Navy

Peers
Anderson Marine
Tebma Shipyard Limited

References

Shipbuilding companies of India
Shipyards of India
Surat district